Mannar Island Lighthouse is a lighthouse in Talaimannar on Mannar Island in northern Sri Lanka. Built in 1915, the  white lighthouse has a round cylindrical tower with lantern and gallery.

See also

 Mannar Island Lighthouse (old)
List of lighthouses in Sri Lanka

References

External links
 Sri Lanka Ports Authority 
 Lighthouses of Sri Lanka

Lighthouses completed in 1915
Lighthouses in Sri Lanka
Buildings and structures in Mannar District